Pinewood Smile is the fifth studio album released by British hard rock band The Darkness. Produced by Adrian Bushby, the album was released on 6 October 2017 and is the first album by the band to be released by Cooking Vinyl. It is also their full first album to feature Rufus Tiger Taylor on drums, after Emily Dolan Davies left the band in 2015.

Background
Details of the album were first revealed in March 2017 on the band's Facebook page, and was estimated for released in late 2017. The album's title and more details were later revealed on 21 July 2017, with the album's title being revealed as Pinewood Smile and being given a release date of 6 October through Cooking Vinyl. The album was recorded entirely in Worcestershire in Vada Recording Studios and was produced by award-winning producer and engineer Adrian Bushby, who has worked with other rock bands such as Muse, Foo Fighters and Smashing Pumpkins. That same day, the first single from the album, "All the Pretty Girls", was released. Three other singles from the album—"Solid Gold" and  "Southern Trains" were also pre-released from the album on 18 August and 25 September respectively with  "Happiness" following the album's release on 24 November.

A live version of "Buccaneers of Hispaniola" was a pre-release single in April 2018 for the album Live at Hammersmith

Critical reception 
Pinewood Smile received generally positive reviews from music critics. At Metacritic, which assigns a weighted mean rating out of 100 to reviews from mainstream critics, the album received an average score of 71 based on 7 reviews. Kerrang! ranked the album as the 23rd best album of 2017 in their year-end list.
{{Album ratings
| rev1 = AllMusic
| rev1score = 
| rev2 = Clash
| rev2score = 6/10
| rev3 = Pitchfork
| rev3score = 4.8/10<ref name="PF">{{cite web|url=https://pitchfork.com/reviews/albums/the-darkness-pinewood-smile|title=The Darkness: Pinewood Smile|website=Pitchfork|date=October 12, 2017|accessdate=December 23, 2016|last=Cohen|first=Ian}}</ref>
| MC = 71/100
}}

Track listing

 The vinyl version omits the track "Happiness" due to space limitations.

Personnel

 The Darkness 
Justin Hawkins – vocals, guitars, piano
Dan Hawkins – guitars, backing vocals
Frankie Poullain – bass, backing vocals
Rufus Tiger Taylor – drums, backing vocals

 Production 
 Adrian Bushby - mixer, producer
 George Perks - engineer
 Mike Marsh - mastering

Charts

SinglesSolid Gold peaked at number 5 on the Kerrang! Rock Chart in September 2017, while Southern Trains'' reached number 14 on the same chart in October of that year.

References

2017 albums
The Darkness (band) albums
Cooking Vinyl albums